Bankhead railway station (Aberdeen) served the area of Bankhead, Aberdeenshire, Scotland from 1887 to 1937 on the Great North of Scotland Railway.

History 
The station opened on 1 July 1887 by the Great North of Scotland Railway. It closed to both passengers and goods traffic on 5 April 1937.

References

External links 

Disused railway stations in Aberdeenshire
Former Great North of Scotland Railway stations
Railway stations in Great Britain opened in 1887
Railway stations in Great Britain closed in 1937
1887 establishments in Scotland
1937 disestablishments in Scotland